The Myanma Investment and Commercial Bank (abbreviated MICB) is a state-owned bank. MICB has branches mainly in Yangon and Mandalay and focuses primarily on business and domestic currency-denominated loans for commercial, investment, and development activities. MFTB also manages Burma's official foreign currency reserves. MICB also acts as a banking intermediary for foreign investment activities.

The bank was established under the Financial Institutions of Myanmar Law of 1990, which separated the bank from Myanma Economic Bank.

References

Banks of Myanmar
Banks established in 1990
1990 establishments in Myanmar
Companies based in Yangon